Sonza is a surname. Notable people with the surname include:

Jay Sonza (born 1955), Filipino newscaster and talk show host
Luísa Sonza (born 1998), Brazilian singer-songwriter

Other uses
Licania platypus, a tree native to Central America with the common name sonza